"On the Dark Side" is a song by fictional American rock band Eddie and the Cruisers, released as a tie-in to the 1983 film of the same name. When initially released in September 1983, the song peaked at No. 64 on the Billboard, while the film itself was pulled after three weeks in the theaters. When the film was released to home video and pay cable outlets in early 1984, the film as well as the song received renewed interest and the single was re-released. This time, the song reached No. 7 on the Billboard Hot 100 and No. 19 on Canada's RPM 100. It also spent five weeks at No. 1 on the Billboard Rock Tracks chart.

John Cafferty & The Beaver Brown Band served as the real-life, officially uncredited stand-ins for the fictional Cruisers on the recording (as they did for the rest of the soundtrack album); only one member of the band, saxophonist Michael Antunes, appeared in the film, and none of the other actors playing Eddie and the Cruisers were musicians. The band performed the songs in the style of Bruce Springsteen and the E Street Band.

Chart performance

First US release (1983)

US re-release (1984)

Year-end charts

References

1983 songs
1984 singles
John Cafferty songs
Scotti Brothers Records singles